, also called Multiple General Node Combine System or Mu.Gen.Bine is a Japanese transforming robot toyline first released on 27 December 2003 by Bandai. Designed by PLEX, Mugenbine is the successor of the Machine Robo line of transforming toy robots.

About Mugenbine
Mugenbine is a term derived from the words mugen, which is Japanese for 'infinite', and the English word 'combine', which is the theme for the series. Mugenbine uses numerous interlocking pegs and sockets to attach and remove components and relocate them in order to form different modes. While all figures have at least two official alternate modes and most have official combinations with one to three other figures, the concept of the line is to allow you to assemble your own animal and machine creations.

Core figures
The majority of the series consists of figures called Mugenroids, basic block-proportioned figures that can contort and fold into various shapes, most notably a cube, to form the core of its various modes. While they generally look identical aside from color scheme, each Mugenroid has a different head sculpt. Most sets come with six to ten components called 'bine parts' that attach via the many pegs and holes on the Mugenroid, as well as on each other, to create other forms. At first, each figure featured an animal and vehicle mode only, but later sets expanded to include larger robot modes as well, and some even later sets did away with the vehicle mode. As the toyline expanded, new cores were created. Most notable is the Turboroid, which can't bend as many ways as its predecessor, but already has wheels attached to help form vehicle modes and included completely unique heads that could rotate. Others used no core figure at all, instead coming with a Mugen Engine that allows spinning gimmicks. Later figures use new core bots called Buildroids that are formed from parts themselves and feature small pilot figures called Roiders.

Toy List

Mugen Gattai series (ムゲン合体シリーズ)
The basic series of toys are referred to as "Mugen Gattai" (fusion) figures. The initial release of these figures came alphabetically, as well as having most Mugenroids (ムゲンロイド) feature a matching letter on the side of their head. This initial series is often called the "Letter" or "Alphabet" series for these reasons. The toyline is known for running themes for its figures. The toys Teiouryu, Uzumakidori, Wanrikiguma, and Yuutenma were called Ridebines (ライドバイン), as their vehicle modes don't require the Mugenroid to form its core, rather the parts formed a vehicle for the Mugenroid to ride on. The figures Quest Knight, Save Gunman, and Razor Ninja were referred to in commercials as the Three Musketeers and are designed after historical warrior types, a knight, a cowboy, and a ninja respectively. The various dinosaur figures, likewise, were considered their own subgroup. The series also introduced larger, deluxe figures. These included Victory Leon, an upgrade of Air Leon, and Zord Elephant.

1 Fang Tiger and Kaiser Condor were reengineered from Air Leon and Carry Eagle respectively. 
2 Galaxy Rex and Heat Tricera also combine in animal mode as Mugen Brachio Double (ムゲンブラキオダブル).
3 These figures are Turboroids and thus do not feature their assigned letter on their head sculpts.
4 Yuutenma combines into extra parts for all three of Teiouryu's modes
5 Mugen General 7's figures can also combine into a super animal mode.

Some of the more popular figures were released a second time in new color schemes and usually with new weapon parts. Figures that officially combine were repacked like this as well.

1 This set was also packed with Protoroid, a translucent green Mugenroid.
2 The additional parts allowed Lead Saurus an official robot mode.
3 This pack included five insect-based bine parts to form weapons and upgrades in the toy's various modes
4 This pack included three weapon parts that combined into a lion called Armed Leon

The Mugen Gattai series continued as more variations of Mugenbine were released, though the figures became simpler, and did away with machine modes. Instead of English letters, these figures were themed after katakana instead.  They generally included official combinations with the larger Mugen Engine figures released at the time.

1 Spit Cobra is the only Mugenbine figure to include spring-launched missiles.

Another set was released that included three new Mugenroids recolored in translucent plastic. Spark Roid, Quick Roid, and Rush Roid came with only a few bine parts that acted as weaponry, or provided torso and head attachments to combine into Roid General 3.

Mugen Base series (ムゲンベースシリーズ)
Part of the Mugen Gattai series, these deluxe sized sets were released with Turboroids (ターボロイド) and along with animal, machine, and robot modes, also formed bases for the smaller Turoboid machines to use. Their bine parts also combine to form larger, big machine modes that the smaller machines can ride in. They're known for their large box components that form the bulk of their modes. Part of their design is to allow fans who want to build gigantic robots from their sets to accomplish them easier, as such all base figures come with an extra head for this purpose.

1 Mugen Police, Mugen Fire, and Muge Builder combine into Mugen Commander 3 (ムゲンコマンダー 3)

Mugen Engine series (ムゲンエンジンシリーズ)
Some figures released did away with the core robot completely. Instead, the toy's various forms were built around a Mugen Engine, also called a Tornado Engine. These engines use a series of gears and wheels to allow parts connected to it to spin when triggered, allowing some combinations with other Mugenbine toys as spinning weapons. While all figures have robot modes, some do not have machine modes.  As with the later Mugen Gattai series, these sets have a katakana theme.

1 Saga Falcon included a lion-based robot named Sig Sphinx (シグスフィンクス) which combined with it for its robot mode.
2 Named Chienojishi (チエノジシ), Tsuwamonojishi (ツワモノジシ), Tekkenzou (テッケンゾウ), and Toukondaka (トウコンダカ), respectively.

Build Gattai series (ビルド合体シリーズ)
Returning to the concept of a core robot, the Build Gattai are the newest form of normal Mugenbine figures. Rather than a one piece Mugenroid or Turboroid, a new figure called a Buildroid (ビルドロイド) is used. These are made up of bine parts themselves and feature a cockpit for a mini figure, called a Roider, to sit inside. Buildroids are a good bit bigger than Mugenroids, meaning these sets usually had a lot more bine parts, and also return to the formula of including machine, animal, and robot modes.

1 The Doberman form is accomplished without using the Buildroid, who is police themed.
2 Dark Flame Dragon includes two Roider pilots and includes 16 official modes including its main animal, machine, and robot modes.

Candy Toy series
While no recent Gattai series toys have been released, Mugenbine survives as a series of candy toys. These are released similar to how baseball cards are sold in America, at convenience stores on the checkout counter and at specialty shops, and packed with them is a piece of candy, similar to large Smarties (Ce De Candy). They tend to be much more simple, with little paint, relying heavily on stickers for its detailing, and with parts that usually come still attached to their plastic trees like model kits. The line was revived in 2017 under the name Mugen Saga, featuring enhanced detailing on some parts.

Series one
This series reused popular original Mugenbine figures, though heavily simplified, Air Leon's lion head no longer tucked away in jet mode for example. A new combined robot mode for the three was also devised.

Series two - Mugen Four Holy Beasts (ムゲン四聖獣)
Beginning with this series, candy toys became whole new sculpts and were released in groups of five, with one piece being a simplified Mugenroid, lacking ratcheted joints and movable pegs. The remaining four are beast based and form weapon modes for larger Mugenbine figures. For this initial set, the animals are based on the four saint beasts of Japanese lore. The five figures combine into Mugen Emperor (ムゲンエンペラー)

Because of the popularity of this set, it was released again, this time beside dark repaints of themselves. These figures used a new theme on names, replacing Mugen with Death while retaining their previous names, and likewise, combined into Death Emperor, only the second official villain in the Mugenbine franchise after Xenonbine.

Series three - Mugen Four Dragons (ムゲン四龍伝)
The second new series followed the same theme as the first, this time the Mugenroid was released along with four different dragons, each with a different theme and weapon mode. Combined, they became Mugen Ryuuou (ムゲンリュウオウ, Dragon King), who was notably larger and better articulated than its predecessor.

Series four - Mugen Golden God (ムゲン金王神) and Mugen Silver God (ムゲン銀王者)
Created by repainting all the figures from the Four Holy Beast and Four Dragons sets, these sets were boxed together, typically coming one of each per box. Rather than retaining the original combinations with new colors, the designers rearranged the figures and designed completely new robot modes, along with sculpting new heads for the robot modes. This series also included a small storyline featuring their battle with Dark Flame Dragon as well as their similarities.

Series five - Mugen Five God Beasts (ムゲン五神獣)
This series of figures removes the Mugenroid from the design and replaces it with a Buildroid complete with Roider figure. The theme of the set is Egyptian mythology, featuring designs based on many Egyptian gods, and combine into Mugen Pharaoh (ムゲンファラオ). According to Tokyo Toy Show 2009, the set is reissued and set to be released again in November.

Series six - Mugen Holy Beasts of the Sword (ムゲン剣聖獣)
Released in June, the set focuses on mythical and horned animals, most of which from European legend. It also retains the Buildroid construction as its core robot is more complex than a Mugenroid. They combine into a robot called Mugen Arthur (ムゲンアーサー), a reference to King Arthur.

Series seven - Mugen Holy Beasts of the Sea (ムゲン海聖獣)
The next series of candy toys featured a new theme of sea beasts. The new set is composed of a brand new mold based on sea animals, which combine to form Mugen Pirates. Mugen Leviathan from the previous set can also be added on to create Mugen Kaioh (ムゲンパイレーツ).

Series eight & nine - Mugen Fighting God Beasts (ムゲン闘神獣)
The next two series of candy toys were released the same month. The sets featured an Indian theme. Each set could be combined to form a larger robot and all twelve figures could be combined to form Mugen Enou (ムゲンエンオウ, Fire Emperor).

Series ten and eleven - Mugen Phantom Saint Beast (ムゲン幻聖獣)
The Tenth and Eleventh series of the Mugenbine Candy Toys features an all European Mystic theme. Series 10 was released on 15 June 2009 while 11 was released in July 2009 and featured twelve Beasts, with the first six combining to form Mugen Guardian (ムゲンガーディアン), while the others combine into Mugen Ryustorm (リュウストームバイン). Both sets can also combine to form Mugen Shinou (ムゲンシンオウ).

Series twelve - G Mugenbine Series: Mugen G Gentoshi (ムゲンバインG幻闘士)
The Twelfth of the Mugenbine Candy Toys features a direct sequel to the Phantom Saint Beast line. Released in August 2009, the series was sold in Gashaphon Eggs and it features five figures which combine into either Mugen G-Phantom (ムゲンジーファントム) or Mugen Blade (ムゲンブレード), which can be used by Mugen Shinou. This also marks the start of the new Mugenbine lineup named "G Mugenbine Series".

Series thirteen and fourteen - Mugen Fierce God Beast (ムゲン猛神獣)
The Thirteenth of the Mugenbine Candy Toys series was announced at the Tokyo Toy Show 2009 and was released in September 2009. The series features an African Safari Theme and it's composed of seven units (Counting RyuuDash), which can combine into Mugen Safari (ムゲンサファリ). The set can also combine with the Garyuuki set, which is planned to be released later in October 2009. The second set is composed of six units which can combine into Mugen Ryuuborn (リュウボーンバインズ), which has both Dragon and Fighter modes. Both sets can combine further to form Mugen Juuoh (ムゲンジュウオウ).

Series fifteen - Mugen Super Demon Beasts (ムゲン超魔獣)
The Fifteenth line of the Mugenbine Candy Toys is stated to be released in January 2010 and it will have an Evil Magic theme unlike the first 14 Mugenbine Candy Toy releases. It has six units that combines into Mugen Satan (ムゲンサタン) and it was counted as the third official villain in the Mugenbine franchise after both Xenonbine and Death Emperor.

Gakuen Gattai Moebine series (学炎合体モエバイン)
Inspired by Mugenbine, The Moebine is a new series of Mugenbine Candy Toys released in 2009. It features cute anime-style Bine Girls (which inspired on Busou Shinki) accompanied with their Bine Mates, which can Bine Cross with their respective girls to give them powerful weapons.

Ninjutsu Club edition
The First Lineup of the Moebine collection. The Ninjutsu Club edition consists of Takane Endou & Homura Hawk, Kyouko Kamitsuki & Fuuma Viper, Tamami Kamaguchi & Raiden Toad, Uruha Oogami & Kouga Wolf, and Sarii Sarutobi & Shinobi Ape. Each Bine Girl is incredibly poseable with thirty points of articulation to play with, and all five of their Bine Mates (バインメイト) can Super Bine Cross to form the Mitsurugi Kaizer (ミツルギカイザー) robot. The Bine Mates can also be combined in another way to form Homura Kaizer (ホムラカイザー). Also the Bine Mates has compatibility with the previous Mugenbine Toys.

Evolbine
Based loosely on the egg prizes from coin machines. The Evolbine series (katakana: エヴォルバイン - sometimes incorrectly romanized as "Evobine") are made up of five figures that each "evolve" from an egg to a hatchling to a beast form. The five eggs and their parts also have a combiner mode.

Series I - Mugen Burning (ムゲンバーニング)

Series II - Mugen Tornado (ムゲントルネード) and Mugen Storm (ムゲンストーム)

Series III - Mugen Lightning (ムゲンライトニング)

Storyline
Little backstory is given for the Mugenbine toyline aside besides commercials and the back of toy packaging.

According to fiction from the commercials, the story takes place in Mugenpolis (ムゲンポリス), where the first Mugenbine, Air Leon, was developed, soon followed by Build Giraffe and Carry Eagle, designed to counter emergencies in the city. The only villain seen is Xenonbine, an evil Mugenbine capable of more combinations than any of the others at the time. The commercials also explained the characters Great Rex, Heat Tricera, and Zord Elephant were created by Mugenbine's North American branch. After Victory Leon is created to serve as a gateway to the city, the commercials begin referring to it as Mugen City (ムゲンシティ), and introduced the Mugen Bases. Arch Tiger's commercial also implies an unseen, ominous enemy as its appearance causes the sky to turn purple. There is also a side story featuring the Ridebine characters who are searching for legendary weapons, a theme supported by the manga included with these figures where they battle a machine monster powered by these weapons, as well as their inclusion with numerous Teiouryu figures as "prize parts", the weapon parts from Assault Leon, Energy Rhinoce, and Great Rex molded in gold plastic.

At some point, the storyline on the packages tell that the Mugenroids are taken over and turn against the city. As a result, the Buildroids are created, with human pilots that could not be controlled. They're left as the only protectors of Mugen City in the face of the new threat. The storyline is presumed to be ongoing as the most recent toy releases also includes a pilot figure.

See also
Machine Robo

External links
Bandai's Official Mugenbine Candy Toys Website
Zinc Panic's Mugenbine page
Mugenbine Collectors Resource

References

Super robot anime and manga
Transforming toy robots
Bandai brands
2000s toys